Caldesmon is a protein that in humans is encoded by the CALD1 gene.

Caldesmon is a calmodulin binding protein. Like calponin, caldesmon  tonically inhibits the ATPase activity of myosin in smooth muscle.

This gene encodes a calmodulin- and actin-binding protein that plays an essential role in the regulation of smooth muscle and nonmuscle contraction. The conserved domain of this protein possesses the binding activities to Ca++-calmodulin, actin, tropomyosin, myosin, and phospholipids. This protein is a potent inhibitor of the actin-tropomyosin activated myosin MgATPase, and serves as a mediating factor for Ca++-dependent inhibition of smooth muscle contraction. Alternative splicing of this gene results in multiple transcript variants encoding distinct isoforms.

Immunochemistry 

In diagnostic immunochemistry, caldesmon is a marker for smooth muscle differentiation.

References

Further reading

External links
 

Proteins